One Man's Hero is a 1999 historical war drama film directed by Lance Hool and starring Tom Berenger, Joaquim de Almeida and Daniela Romo. The film has the distinction of being the last film released by Orion Pictures' arthouse division Orion Classics, as well as being the last Orion Pictures film, until 2013's Grace Unplugged, when Metro-Goldwyn-Mayer revived the Orion Pictures brand.

The film is a dramatization of the true story of John Riley and the Saint Patrick's Battalion, a group of Irish Catholic immigrants who desert the mostly Protestant U.S. Army to join the mostly Catholic Mexican side during the Mexican–American War of 1846 to 1848.

Plot

The story centers around Sgt. John Riley and 16 men of his U.S. Army battalion who (against military law) are whipped for "desertion" only because they had traveled—without an explicit permission—to the Mexican side of the border to fulfill their religious obligation to attend Mass, and because they are thought to be "Papists" whose loyalty is ipso facto suspect in the eyes of their Protestant commanders. Sgt. Riley, with regard for the safety and well-being of his men, releases them at gun-point from the lash. He escorts them across the border to Mexico to hopefully find at Vera Cruz a ship back to Ireland, only to be violently captured by the revolutionary Juan Cortina as enemies of Mexico. Riley, wounded in his thigh, is nursed by Cortina's woman Marta. As Cortina considers what to eventually do with Riley and his men, news arrives that the U.S. and Mexico are now at war. Because of this, after a visit from the representative of the Mexican government the Irish deserters are presented with the choice of joining and fighting on the side of the Mexican Army, thus forming their own battalion under command by Riley.

Riley is made a captain, in charge of all the Irish-immigrant U.S. soldiers who have come over to the Mexican side in increasingly large numbers, (as General Zachary Taylor puts it, "because of sex, saints and sadism"). For encouragement they are given their own green flag as the Saint Patrick's Battalion.

Several key battle engagements are highlighted, with dates, and a cease-fire is reached. Meanwhile, the U.S. Senate is threatening to impeach President Polk as opinion turns against U.S. aggression and the invasion of the Republic of Mexico. The cease-fire is soon violated and hostilities resume. Gen. Zachary Taylor, unlike Gen. Winfield Scott, deplores the war, but he obeys his commander-in-chief.

As it becomes increasingly evident that the war is being lost by Mexico, Riley's men debate what to do. There is a difference between desertion and treason. Those who deserted before the war and are taken back to the U.S. will be lashed and branded; those who deserted after the declaration of war will be hanged as traitors. They decide to die as men fighting for freedom. When they finally lose, Cortina has escaped with many of his forces, and the Irish are taken prisoner. Many of them are still officially British citizens, having never yet been granted the U.S. citizenship they had first been promised for enlisting in the U.S. Army. General Winfield Scott utterly rejects the appeal of the Mexican Government, presented by Col. Nexor, to recognize Riley's men as Mexican citizens and prisoners of war; protests have come in from all the nations of the world denouncing their punishment as barbaric and an utter contradiction of the principles of the American Revolution. Scott is adamant: the deserters will be lashed and branded, and forced to watch those condemned as traitors hanged, whose heads will be forcibly faced in the direction of Chapultepec to watch the taking of that stronghold and the sight of the lowering of the Mexican flag and the raising of the Stars and Stripes, so that this will be their last sight—they will be hanged at that instant.

On the day of their execution, in sight of the men on the scaffold, Riley is lashed with a cat-o-nine-tails: 50 strokes. He is then branded on his right cheek with a large letter D "just below the eye, so not to impair his vision." The soldier ordered to wield the red-hot brand is told to do it quickly, as "Riley must be conscious when it is done!". Visibly shaken, the soldier sears the brand into Riley's face upside down (backward). He is harshly reprimanded, then told to "do it right!", but he vomits and faints, and Riley is branded on his left cheek by the officer in charge of punishment. Riley is then forced to watch the executions ordered by Scott. He loudly cries out encouragement to them, who shout back as they are hanged.

Some time afterward, while working in a stone quarry for military prisoners, Riley is told by his former U.S. commander that he has been freed, to which he responds, "I have always been free". Riley returns to Mexico, locates Cortina, and finds Marta still alive. She still has the green flag of the St. Patrick's Battalion. Cortina recognizes her love for Riley and departs. Riley and Marta disappear into the wilderness. The epilogue explains that Gen. Winfield Scott, who had hoped to become President of the U.S., was defeated, and Gen. Zachary Taylor, who only wanted peace, was elected.

Cast
 Tom Berenger as Sergeant / Lieutenant / Captain John Riley
 Joaquim de Almeida as Cortina
 Daniela Romo as Marta
 Mark Moses as  Colonel Benton Lacy
 Stuart Graham as  Corporal Kenneally
 Gregg Fitzgerald as  Paddy Noonan
 Don Wycherley as Brian Athlone
 Wolf Muser as Corporal Schultz
 Luke Hayden as Seamus McDougherty
 Ilia Volok as  Daniel Grzbalski
 Patrick Bergin as General Winfield Scott
 James Gammon as  General Zachary Taylor
 Carlos Carrasco as  Dominguez
 Stephen Tobolowsky as Captain Gaine
 Jorge Bosso as Col. Maximo Nexor
 Roger Cudney as Col. Harney

Prince Albert of Monaco, using the stage name of Kelly (his mother's maiden name), had a cameo appearance in the movie. He has a connection to Mexico through his grandfather, Prince Pierre, Duke of Valentinois, whose mother, Susana María de la Torre y Mier was a member of the Mexican nobility.

Awards

References

External links
 
 
 Movie Review: 'One Man's Hero', a Heartfelt History Lesson, Los Angeles Times 

1999 films
Films set in the 1840s
Irish diaspora
Irish Diaspora films
Irish-American mass media
Mexican-American culture
Mexican–American War
Orion Pictures films
American war films
Cultural depictions of Zachary Taylor
Films directed by Lance Hool
1990s English-language films
1990s American films